Visual hallucinations in psychosis are hallucinations accompanied by delusions.

Presentation 
Visual hallucinations in psychoses are reported to have physical properties similar to real perceptions. They are often life-sized, detailed, and solid, and are projected into the external world. They typically appear anchored in external space, just beyond the reach of individuals, or further away. They can have three-dimensional shapes, with depth and shadows, and distinct edges. They can be colorful or in black and white and can be static or have movement.

Simple vs. complex 
Visual hallucinations may be simple, or non-formed visual hallucinations, or complex, or formed visual hallucinations.

Simple visual hallucinations without structure are known as phosphenes and those with geometric structure are known as photopsias. These hallucinations are caused by irritation to the primary visual cortex (Brodmann's area 17).

Sometimes, hallucinations are 'Lilliputian', i.e., patients experience visual hallucinations where there are miniature people, often undertaking unusual actions. Lilliputian hallucinations may be accompanied by wonder, rather than terror.

Content 
The frequency of hallucinations varies widely from rare to frequent, as does duration (seconds to minutes). The content of hallucinations varies as well. Complex (formed) visual hallucinations are more common than Simple (non-formed) visual hallucinations. In contrast to hallucinations experienced in organic conditions, hallucinations experienced as symptoms of psychoses tend to be more frightening. An example of this would be hallucinations that have imagery of bugs, dogs, snakes, distorted faces. Visual hallucinations may also be present in those with Parkinson's, where visions of dead individuals can be present. In psychoses, this is relatively rare, although visions of God, angels, the devil, saints, and fairies are common. Individuals often report being surprised when hallucinations occur and are generally helpless to change or stop them. In general, individuals believe that visions are experienced only by themselves.

Causes 

Two neurotransmitters are particularly important in visual hallucinations – serotonin and acetylcholine. They are concentrated in the visual thalamic nuclei and visual cortex.

The similarity of visual hallucinations that stem from diverse conditions suggest a common pathway for visual hallucinations. Three pathophysiologic mechanisms are thought to explain this.

The first mechanism has to do with cortical centers responsible for visual processing. Irritation of visual association cortices (Brodmann's areas 18 and 19) cause complex visual hallucinations.

The second mechanism is deafferentation, the interruption or destruction of the afferent connections of nerve cells, of the visual system, caused by lesions, leading to the removal of normal inhibitory processes on cortical input to visual association areas, leading to complex hallucinations as a release phenomenon.

Prevalence 

The DSM-V lists visual hallucinations as a primary diagnostic criterion for several psychotic disorders, including schizophrenia and schizoaffective disorder. Visual hallucinations can occur as a symptom of the above psychotic disorders in 24% to 72% of patients at some point in the course of their illness.

References

Hallucinations
Medical signs
Psychosis
Symptoms and signs of mental disorders